Acrobasis bifidella is a species of snout moth in the genus Acrobasis. It was described by John Henry Leech in 1889. It is found in China, Japan and Korea.

References

Moths described in 1889
Acrobasis
Moths of Asia